Stefano Civeriati (born October 7, 1966 in Sale) is an Italian professional football coach and a former player. Currently, he manages the amateur side Sale Piovera.

1966 births
Living people
Italian footballers
Serie A players
Serie B players
Inter Milan players
F.C. Pavia players
U.S. Catanzaro 1929 players
Venezia F.C. players
L.R. Vicenza players
U.S. Livorno 1915 players
Italian football managers
A.S.D. HSL Derthona managers
Novara F.C. managers
A.S.D. HSL Derthona players
Association football midfielders
U.S. Imperia 1923 players